Poecilopsetta is a genus of small righteye flounders mainly found in deep water in the Indo-Pacific. Two species, P. beanii and P. inermis, are from the West Atlantic.

Species
The currently recognized species in this genus are:
 Poecilopsetta albomaculata Norman, 1939
 Poecilopsetta beanii (Goode, 1881) (deepwater dab)
 Poecilopsetta colorata Günther, 1880 (colored righteye flounder)
 Poecilopsetta dorsialta Guibord & Chapleau, 2001
 Poecilopsetta hawaiiensis C. H. Gilbert, 1905
 Poecilopsetta inermis (Breder, 1927)
 Poecilopsetta macrocephala Hoshino, Amaoka & Last, 2001
 Poecilopsetta multiradiata Kawai, Amaoka & Séret, 2010
 Poecilopsetta natalensis Norman, 1931 (African righteye flounder)
 Poecilopsetta normani Foroshchuk & Fedorov, 1992
 Poecilopsetta pectoralis Kawai & Amaoka, 2006
 Poecilopsetta plinthus (D. S. Jordan & Starks, 1904) (tile-colored righteye flounder)
 Poecilopsetta praelonga Alcock, 1894 (Alcock's narrow-body righteye flounder)
 Poecilopsetta vaynei Quéro, Hensley & Maugé, 1988
 Poecilopsetta zanzibarensis Norman, 1939

References 

Pleuronectidae
Marine fish genera
Taxa named by Albert Günther